Tsu Nedhé 196H is an Indian reserve of the Smith's Landing First Nation in Alberta, located within Improvement District No. 24 (Wood Buffalo National Park).

References

Indian reserves in Alberta